Malcolm Island is an island in the Canadian province of British Columbia, located north of Haddington Island in the Queen Charlotte Strait near Vancouver Island. It has ferry access from the Vancouver Island community of Port McNeill. The island is located within the Mount Waddington Regional District.

Malcolm Island has daily BC Ferry service for both vehicles and passengers.  The ferry schedule is available at BCFerries.com, there are approximately 6 daily sailings.

The main community on Malcolm Island is Sointula.

Malcolm Island was named for Admiral Sir Pulteney Malcolm.

References

Islands of British Columbia
Central Coast of British Columbia